Sports Today is a long-running radio show on Melbourne, Australia radio station 3AW.

It currently airs on Monday to Thursday from 6 pm to 8 pm and is hosted by Gerard Healy and Sam McClure. Previously, it was hosted by David Hookes and Gerard Healy. On the first show after Hookes' death, Healy provided a memorable and emotional ode to his great mate. Dwayne Russell took over the co-host role following this incident in early 2004 and remained as co-host until 2019 when Russell moved to rival station SEN. McClure took over Russell since 2020.

It has been running for 12 years and is the highest rating sports radio show in Melbourne.

Formerly produced by Jac Woodcock and Ralph Horowitz, its current senior producer is Mike Barrett. Contributors include Mike Sheahan, Caroline Wilson, Nathan Buckley, Tony Shaw, and Robert Walls.

Australian radio programs